James or Jim Burges(s) may refer to:

 James Burgess (archaeologist) (1832–1916), British archaeologist active in India
 James Burgess (American football, born 1994) (born 1994), American football player
 James Burgess (gridiron football) (born 1974), American football player
 James Burgess (attorney) (1915–1997), United States Attorney for the Southern District of Illinois
 James Burgess Jr., member of the Legislative Assembly of New Brunswick
 Jim Burgess (golfer), winner of 1980 Azalea Invitational golf tournament
 Jim Burgess (Ontario politician), Green Party candidate for Chatham-Kent—Essex in the Ontario general election, 2003
 Jim Burgess (producer) (1952–1993), disco record producer and disc jockey of the 1970s
 Sir James Lamb, 1st Baronet (1752–1824), born James Burges

See also 
 Richard James Burgess (born 1949), musician